The Lippmann Islands are a group of small islands  in extent, lying close northwest of Lahille Island off the west coast of Graham Land, Antarctica. They were originally mapped as a single island by the French Antarctic Expedition, 1903–05, under Jean-Baptiste Charcot, and named by him for French physicist and Nobel Prize winner Gabriel Lippmann.

See also 
 List of Antarctic and sub-Antarctic islands

References

Islands of Graham Land
Graham Coast